is the 9th single by Berryz Kobo. It was released on November 23, 2005 by Up-Front Works' Piccolo Town label, as well as a version by Marvelous Entertainment, which featured a slightly different track listing.  Abbreviated as "Gag100".

Details

 Main vocalist: Momoko Tsugunaga
 Minor vocalists: Miyabi Natsuyaki, Risako Sugaya
 Center: Momoko Tsugunaga

Used as the ending theme of Pretty Cure Max Heart Movie 2.

Due to Maiha Ishimura's graduation, this was the first Berryz Kobo single to feature only 7 members.

Track listing

Piccolo Town Edition
  <br/ > (Composition and Lyrics: Tsunku, Arrangement: Yuichi Takahashi)
  <br/ > (Composition and Lyrics: Tsunku, Arrangement: Takao Konishi, Song: Berryz Kobo & Mari Yaguchi)
 "Gag 100-Kaibun Aishite Kudasai" (Instrumental)

Marvelous Entertainment Edition

 
 
 "Crystal"
 "Gag 100-Kaibun Aishite Kudasai" (Original karaoke)
 "Crystal" (Original karaoke)

PV Versions
 Normal version
 Close-up version
 Dance Shot Version

2005 singles
Songs written by Tsunku
Berryz Kobo songs
Song recordings produced by Tsunku
2005 songs
Piccolo Town singles
Japanese film songs
Songs written for animated films
Pretty Cure songs